The Mount Dulan is a mountain in Donghe Township and Yanping Township of Taitung County, Taiwan.

Geology
The mountain is located on Beinan Plain. It is fully covered by mid and low-altitude of broad-leaved trees.

Facilities
The mountain features a hiking trail starting from the foothill in Donghe Township.

See also
 List of tourist attractions in Taiwan
 List of mountains in Taiwan
 Dulan Village, a scenic oceanside town at the foot of the mountain

References

Landforms of Taitung County
Dulan
Tourist attractions in Taitung County
Mountaineering in Taiwan